Çevrimtepe is a village in the Baykan District of Siirt Province in Turkey. The village is populated by Kurds of the Silokan tribe and had a population of 199 in 2021.

The hamlets of Oymaklar, Toptepe and Ulukapı are attached to the village.

References 

Kurdish settlements in Siirt Province
Villages in Baykan District